Mesosella kumei is a species of beetle in the family Cerambycidae. It was described by Takakuwa in 1984.

References

Pteropliini
Beetles described in 1984